Hector Roy Maclean may refer to:
Hector Roy Maclean, 5th Laird of Coll
Red Hector of the Battles Maclean, also known as Hector Roy Maclean

See also
Hector MacLean (disambiguation)